The 2011 BMW Ljubljana Open was a professional tennis tournament played on clay courts. It was the 20th edition of the tournament which was part of the 2011 ATP Challenger Tour. It took place in Ljubljana, Slovenia between 19 and 25 September 2011.

Singles main draw entrants

Seeds

 1 Rankings are as of September 12, 2011.

Other entrants
The following players received wildcards into the singles main draw:
  Toni Androić
  Tomislav Brkić
  Tom Kočevar-Dešman
  Tilen Žitnik

The following players received entry from the qualifying draw:
  Mirza Bašić
  Daniele Giorgini
  Dino Marcan
  Diego Schwartzman

The following players received entry from a lucky loser spot:
  Enrico Burzi

Champions

Singles

 Paolo Lorenzi def.  Grega Žemlja, 6–2, 6–4

Doubles

 Aljaž Bedene /  Grega Žemlja def.  Roberto Bautista Agut /  Iván Navarro, 6–3, 6–7(10–12), [12–10]

External links
Official Website
ITF Search
ATP official site

BMW Ljubljana Open
Clay court tennis tournaments
Tennis tournaments in Slovenia
2011 in Slovenian tennis
BMW Ljubljana Open